Luis Ángel García Flores (born 11 February 1984) is a former Mexican professional football player who most recently played for Tijuana.

Club career
García made his debut for UANL Tigres on August 20, 2005, against Club Deportivo Guadalajara. The game ended in a 1–1 tie.

Honors
Tijuana
Liga MX
Apertura 2012

References

External links
 

1984 births
Living people
Footballers from Nuevo León
Sportspeople from Monterrey
Association football midfielders
Querétaro F.C. footballers
Tigres UANL footballers
C.D. Veracruz footballers
Indios de Ciudad Juárez footballers
Atlante F.C. footballers
Club Tijuana footballers
Liga MX players
Mexican footballers